Ashley Forest is a forest and a statistical area in the Canterbury Region's Hurunui District on the east coast of New Zealand's South Island. It is located north of the Ashley River / Rakahuri and northeast of the Okuku River. 

The forest was planted from 1939. It is managed by Rayonier Matariki and is only accessible by the public with a permit.

Ashley Forest Village is a small settlement at the southern end of the forest.

Demographics

Ashley Forest had a population of 669 at the 2018 New Zealand census, an increase of 27 people (4.2%) since the 2013 census, and an increase of 147 people (28.2%) since the 2006 census. There were 234 households. There were 348 males and 324 females, giving a sex ratio of 1.07 males per female. The median age was 44.8 years (compared with 37.4 years nationally), with 138 people (20.6%) aged under 15 years, 105 (15.7%) aged 15 to 29, 327 (48.9%) aged 30 to 64, and 102 (15.2%) aged 65 or older.

Ethnicities were 97.3% European/Pākehā, 7.6% Māori, 0.4% Pacific peoples, 1.3% Asian, and 0.4% other ethnicities (totals add to more than 100% since people could identify with multiple ethnicities).

The proportion of people born overseas was 13.5%, compared with 27.1% nationally.

Although some people objected to giving their religion, 51.6% had no religion, 37.7% were Christian, 0.4% were Buddhist and 1.3% had other religions.

Of those at least 15 years old, 114 (21.5%) people had a bachelor or higher degree, and 75 (14.1%) people had no formal qualifications. The median income was $36,400, compared with $31,800 nationally. The employment status of those at least 15 was that 297 (55.9%) people were employed full-time, 96 (18.1%) were part-time, and 21 (4.0%) were unemployed.

References

Populated places in Canterbury, New Zealand
Forests of New Zealand
Hurunui District